Mohammad ibn Ali may refer to:
 Muhammad al-Baqir, the fourth Ismaili Imam, and fifth Shia Imam
 Mohammad ibn Ali Abbasi, the father of the first two caliphs of Abbasid Dynasty, al-Saffah and al-Mansur